The Amtrak Police Department (APD) is a quasi-federal railroad police department and the law enforcement agency of Amtrak (also known as the National Railroad Passenger Corporation), the government-owned passenger train system in the United States. It is headquartered at Union Station in Washington, D.C., and as of 2019 has a force of 452 sworn police officers, most of whom are stationed within the Northeast Corridor, Amtrak's busiest route.

The APD has primary jurisdiction over Amtrak stations nationwide, trains, rights-of-way, maintenance facilities, and crimes committed against Amtrak, its employees, or its passengers. The APD is one of six American Class I railroad law enforcement agencies, alongside those of BNSF, CSX, Kansas City Southern, Norfolk Southern, and Union Pacific.

Since 1979, most Amtrak police officers are trained at the Federal Law Enforcement Training Centers (FLETC) although some recruits may be certified through a local police academy.

Authority

Created by Congress, Amtrak's enabling legislation under the Rail Passenger Service Act of 1970, now codified starting at 49 U.S.C. 24101, established the authority for Amtrak to have its own police force. 

The statutory authority was unique at the time and included interstate police powers. The Amtrak rail police law, now found at 49 U.S.C. 24305 (e), states as follows:

In sum, Amtrak police officers have the same police authority as a local or state law enforcement officer, within their jurisdiction. They investigate various types of crime that occur within and around stations, trains and/or right of ways.

Counter-terrorism

Since the September 11, 2001 attacks, APD has become more terrorism-focused. Such mission shift became even more prevalent after the Madrid train bombings in 2004. It maintains a robust K-9 division composed of patrol and bomb dogs.

Police cover
APD officers constantly work in partnership with federal, state and local law enforcement to perform their duties in accordance with the agency's mission to protect America's railroads. In theory, officers have jurisdiction in all the 46 states where Amtrak operates, but are stationed more in busier locations in practice.

Operational Divisions 

Each of the Divisional Commands provide different police services for the geographical area they cover. The different divisions within the department can be categorized as the following:

 Patrol Division – Patrol Officers fulfill traditional policing functions. They act as a deterrent to crime in the stations, on trains, in and around Amtrak facilities, and out on the rights-of-way by enforcing laws, providing support at stations, and boarding trains.
Criminal Investigations Division - The Criminal Investigations Unit is responsible for most follow-up investigations and the coordination of any criminal investigative efforts. This Division includes both investigators and detectives.
 Special Operations Unit - The Special Operations Unit (SOU) support Patrol operations by providing rapid response and enhanced capabilities to assist in keeping Amtrak passengers and employees safe.  The SOU also conduct training on railroad-specific tactical response and procedures for fellow Amtrak Police Department members and external law enforcement partner agencies.
Office of Intelligence and Analysis - The Office of Intelligence and Analysis serves as a support element for the different patrol divisions and seeks to increase the safety and security of the passengers and personnel by increasing the department's insight into ongoing threats and potential terrorist acts by the analysis and dissemination of intelligence information.
 Administration - The higher-ranking officers who are responsible for reporting the daily operations to the Amtrak Corporation itself, as well as the responsibility for overseeing the day-to-day functions of the department.
 Support Operations Divisions-  Includes the Training Unit, Quartermaster Unit, a Police Technology Unit, and a Police Report Requests Unit.
 K9 Unit - The Amtrak Police Department K-9 teams provide a deterrent to potential threats from explosives. K9 teams are deployed at stations throughout the system as well as conduct train rides and right-of-way patrols.
National Communications Center - Amtrak's National Communications Center (NCC) is the coordination center for the Amtrak Police Department.  NCC Communications Officers answer calls and respond to text messages from the APD11 "txt-a-tip" system.  The NCC also dispatches officers as needed to respond to incidents and events throughout the country.

Rank structure and insignia

Below is the rank structure for the Amtrak PD.
Ranks are listed from junior (bottom) to senior (top).

Controversies 

In 2016, the Amtrak Office of Inspector General launched an investigation into the then-Amtrak Police Chief Polly Hansen, regarding conflict of interest involving her boyfriend who was awarded a counterterrorism contract she helped oversee, and in whose award Hansen reportedly had influence. In statements, Hansen claimed no knowledge of the boyfriend, but the investigation revealed that they had been cohabiting in a condominium that they jointly owned. In September 2016, after the presidency of Amtrak had passed from Joseph Boardman (who had appointed Hansen in 2012) to Wick Moorman, Chief Hansen resigned.

On February 8, 2017, Amtrak Police Officer LaRoyce Tankson shot and killed an unarmed man, Chad Robertson, who had been spotted smoking marijuana outside Chicago Union Station and was running from police. The bullet was fired from a distance between 75 and 100 feet and struck Robertson in the shoulder from behind. Tankson's attorney, Will Fahy, claimed Tankson saw Robertson turn and reach for what Tankson thought was a firearm and thus believed he was about to be shot. However, four eyewitnesses stated they did not see Robertson gesture having a gun. Tankson was charged with first degree murder and released from custody after posting ten percent of the bail which was set to $250,000. On March 8, 2017, the Amtrak Police Fraternal Order of Police claimed having collected more than $4,000 to help Tankson and contended he fired in self-defense. On February 28, 2020, Officer Tankson was acquitted.

See also

 Bahnpolizei
 British Transport Police
 Federal law enforcement in the United States
 Railroad Guards (Poland)
 Transit police

References

External links

 

Police
Railroad police departments of the United States
Government agencies established in 1970
Organizations based in Washington, D.C.
Agency-specific police departments of the United States